The American Tobacco Trail (ATT) is a  long Rails-to-Trails project located in the Research Triangle region of North Carolina, running along an abandoned railroad bed originally built for the American Tobacco Company in the 1970s. The route crosses through portions of Durham County (including the City of Durham), Chatham County, and Wake County (including the Town of Cary, North Carolina). The ATT is part of the East Coast Greenway and is open to pedestrians, cyclists, equestrians (in non-urban sections) and other non-motorized users.

Starting from the southern end of the trail in New Hill, the 6.5 mile Wake County portion of the trail is gravel, followed by a 4.7-mile multi-use section in Chatham County that contains a paved lane and a gravel (equestrian lane); the northernmost 11.4-mile paved section in Durham County on the north end of the trail ends at the Durham Bulls Athletic Park (DBAP).

The 4.7-mile Chatham County section of the trail was built, and is managed, by the Town of Cary (which resides in both Wake and Chatham counties).

Route

Durham County

The ATT traverses  in Durham County, North Carolina. The trail's northern terminus lies in the city of Durham across Morehead Avenue from the Durham Bulls Athletic Park. It is open to walkers, cyclists, rollerbladers and wheelchair users, but not equestrians. 

The American Tobacco Trail runs through the city of Durham south to the Chatham county line, crossing over I-40 near The Streets at Southpoint mall. A pedestrian bridge was erected over I-40 in April 2013, connecting the northern and southern segments of the Durham County portion of the trail, but due to construction errors, did not open until February 2014. This segment of the ATT within Durham County is a designated portion of the East Coast Greenway.

Chatham County

The ATT trail traverses  in Chatham County, North Carolina. Once the trail crosses into Chatham county, the trail converts to a dual surface of asphalt and compacted screenings. The trail is open for foot, bike and equestrian use by TRTC. The trail crosses Northeast Creek and O'Kelly Chapel Road, past the Old Chatham Golf Course. It also traverses the end of Pittard Sears Road, Panther Creek, and continues past New Hope Church Road.

Wake County
The ATT traverses  in Wake County, North Carolina. The trail is open to hikers, cyclists, wheelchair users and equestrians. Users can access this portion of the greenway most conveniently at 2575 New Hope Church Rd, Cary, NC.

History
J.B. Duke founded the American Tobacco Company in 1890, which subsequently acquired the Lucky Strike Company and over 200 other firms.  The company built processing plants and warehouses in Durham which were served by several rail lines built in 1905.  The rail line to the south which is now the ATT, connected from Durham to Bonsal, NC and onwards to Duncan.  It was known as the New Hope Valley Railway and later Durham & South Carolina (it never got as far as SC), and later became part of the Norfolk Southern Railway system.  In the 1970s the U.S. Army Corps of Engineers built the Jordan Lake reservoir in Chatham County necessitating the relocation of a large portion of the tracks.  A portion of the original right-of-way is presently a natural surface trail accessible off of Stagecoach Rd. in Durham. A new rail line was built on higher ground a few miles to the east.  However, only about 10 years later, the tracks were removed from this new railroad as Norfolk Southern had been bought out, and trains could access the American Tobacco complex via the Southern Railway more economically.  In the 1980s the Triangle Rails to Trails Conservancy (TRTC) was formed to preserve the corridor as a multi-use trail and developed a Master Plan for the ATT in 1992.  Since then, work has progressed at a moderate pace to develop the trail for pedestrian, bicycle, and equestrian use.

See also 
New Hope Valley Railway - tourist railroad at the south end of the ATT
Ellerbe Creek Trail - pedestrian/bicycle greenway north of the ATT

References

External links

 Triangle Rails to Trails Conservancy - principal volunteer/advocacy group for the ATT
 Photographs and stories from a daily ATT bicycle commuter
 Video of entire paved and unpaved trail labeled with distances, cross streets, and other items
 Higher quality video of entire paved and unpaved trail labeled with distances, cross streets, and other items
 Annotated map of ATT from the Raleigh News and Observer, August 2, 2007
 North Carolina Rail-Trail Records, 1987-
  WRAL

Rail trails in North Carolina
Tr
National Recreation Trails in North Carolina
Protected areas of Wake County, North Carolina
Protected areas of Chatham County, North Carolina
Protected areas of Durham County, North Carolina
East Coast Greenway